Cambridge Springs Bridge was a historic metal truss bridge spanning French Creek at Cambridge Springs, Crawford County, Pennsylvania. It was built by the Youngstown Bridge Company of Youngstown, Ohio. It was demolished about 2003.

It was added to the National Register of Historic Places in 1988.

References

Road bridges on the National Register of Historic Places in Pennsylvania
Bridges completed in 1896
Bridges in Crawford County, Pennsylvania
National Register of Historic Places in Crawford County, Pennsylvania
Truss bridges in the United States
Metal bridges in the United States
Baltimore truss bridges
1896 establishments in Pennsylvania